Market Shop is a village on the island of Nevis in Saint Kitts and Nevis. It is the capital of the Saint George Gingerland Parish.

Populated places in Saint Kitts and Nevis
Saint George Gingerland Parish